The Cernat is a right tributary of the Râul Doamnei in Romania. The upper reach of the river is also known as Preotesele. It flows into the Râul Doamnei north of the village Slatina.

References

Rivers of Romania
Rivers of Argeș County